Maublancancylistes maublanci is a species of beetle in the family Cerambycidae. It was described by Lepesme and Breuning in 1956.

References

Acanthocinini
Beetles of Africa
Beetles described in 1956
Taxa named by Stephan von Breuning (entomologist)
Taxa named by Pierre Lepesme